The Niccolò Cusano University, often simply abbreviated as UNICUSANO is a private for-profit online university founded in 2006 in Rome, Italy.

History
The Niccolò Cusano University was founded by Stefano Bandecchi. The university is named after the Roman Catholic cardinal, scientist and astronomer, Nicholas of Cusa (in Italian Niccolò Cusano). Until 9 July 2012, the university was located in Via Casalmonferrato and Via Don Orione. The university Cusano also has a publishing company the Edizioni Edicusano and a foundation for medical research – scientific Fondazione Niccolò Cusano. In 2013 a Faculty of Engineering and Psychology has been established. It provides e-learning courses, counting 94 centers.

Organization

Programs
The university offers degree programs in education sciences, law, political science, economics, engineering, psychology.

Campus
The school is accredited as online university, but it also has a campus in Rome.

University buildings

The Campus is located in Via don Carlo Gnocchi, 3 – 00166 Rome. In the building there are multimedia classrooms, a theater and sports facilities.

Library
There is a library, both traditional and electronic (to the virtual library, which students can access at any time).

Dormitories
Unicusano University provides off-campus students with about 400 places in dorms.

Research Center
Inside the campus is also located the research centre of the Nicholas of Cusa University.

Radio
The school's radio station, Radio Cusano Campus, broadcasts from the campus.

Presidents and rectors

Presidents
Giovanni Iacono (2006–2012)
Stefano Ranucci (2012-2015)
Giovanni Puoti (2015–present)

Rectors
The Rector is the highest academic authority.
Sebastiano Scarcella (2006–2010)
Giovanni Puoti (2010–2013)
Fabio Fortuna (from 1 October 2013)

Notable professor
Maurizio Costanzo
Giovanni Puoti
Fabio Fortuna

See also
Ternana Calcio

References

External links

 
Nicholas of Cusa University, universitaly.it; accessed 30 March 2014  
 Unicusano webpage, unisu.tv; accessed 30 March 2014
 Foundation for the Scientific Research – Nicholas of Cusa University webpage, fondazioneniccolocusano.it; accessed 30 March 2014.

 
Universities and colleges in Rome
Educational institutions established in 2006
Education in Lazio
Distance education institutions based in Italy
Private universities and colleges in Italy
2006 establishments in Italy